Jay Lowder is an American evangelist, author, speaker and founder of Jay Lowder Harvest Ministries based in Wichita Falls, Texas. He is the author of Midnight on Aisle Seven and is a suicide prevention advocate. Lowder performs evangelistic outreaches at churches and student events at churches and schools. He has contributed articles for Fox News, the Washington Post and has appeared on national television stations such as CBN, TBN, CNN and Fox News. Additionally, his ministry airs The Darkest Hour which appeared on late-night blocks on the Discovery Channel, Freeform, Pop, AMGTV, Daystar and TBN. He has appeared on Life Today with James and Betty Robinson, as well as Hour of Power. His daughter has an extremely rare disease, Stills disease.

References 

American evangelists
Living people
Year of birth missing (living people)
Place of birth missing (living people)
Television evangelists
American public speakers
People from Wichita Falls, Texas
Evangelical pastors